The canton of Saint-Étienne-les-Orgues is a former administrative division in southeastern France. It was disbanded following the French canton reorganisation which came into effect in March 2015. It consisted of 8 communes, which joined the canton of Forcalquier in 2015. It had 2,930 inhabitants (2012).

The canton comprised the following communes:

Cruis
Fontienne
Lardiers
Mallefougasse-Augès
Montlaux
Ongles
Revest-Saint-Martin
Saint-Étienne-les-Orgues

Demographics

See also
Cantons of the Alpes-de-Haute-Provence department

References

Former cantons of Alpes-de-Haute-Provence
2015 disestablishments in France
States and territories disestablished in 2015